Canistrum seidelianum is a plant species in the genus Canistrum. This species is endemic to Brazil.

Cultivars
 Canistrum 'Black Sands'

References

BSI Cultivar Registry Retrieved 11 October 2009

seidelianum
Flora of Brazil